Ocean Explorer may refer to:

 Ocean Explorer (ship, 2021), a cruise ship built in 2021 and sailing under the flag of the Bahamas
 Office of Ocean Exploration and Research, a division of the United States National Oceanic and Atmospheric Administration (NOAA)